The Supreme Court Act 2003 (Public Act No 53 2003) was an Act of the Parliament of New Zealand which created the Supreme Court of New Zealand as the country's court of final appeal, and which consequentially abolished appeals to the Judicial Committee of the Privy Council in the United Kingdom. The Act was repealed on 1 March 2017 and replaced by the Senior Courts Act 2016.

Background

Purpose 

Section 3 of the Act states its purpose:

See also 

 Constitution of New Zealand

References 

Statutes of New Zealand
Government of New Zealand
Supreme Court of New Zealand
2003 in New Zealand law
Constitution of New Zealand
Repealed New Zealand legislation